Hans Jakob Polotsky (also Hans Jacob Polotsky, Hans Jakob Polotzky; 13 September 1905 – 10 August 1991) was an Israeli orientalist, linguist, and professor of Semitic languages and Egyptology at the Hebrew University of Jerusalem.

Biography 
Polotsky was born in Zürich, Switzerland, as the son of a Russian Jewish couple. He grew up in Berlin and studied Egyptology and Semitics at the universities of Berlin and Göttingen. From 1926 to 1931 he was a co-worker of the Septuaginta-Unternehmen of the Academy of Sciences at Göttingen. In 1929 he received his Ph.D. degree for the dissertation Zu den Inschriften der 11. Dynastie. He worked in Berlin editing Coptic Manichaean texts from 1933 till 1934, with the Church historian Carl Schmidt. He left Germany in 1935 and settled in Mandate Palestine, where he taught and researched at the Hebrew University in Jerusalem, becoming professor in 1948. In 1953 he founded the Linguistics department there and later served as the dean of the Faculty of Humanities. He died in Jerusalem.

His main achievement was the Études de syntaxe copte published in 1944 which fundamentally changed the scientific view of the syntax of the Coptic and earlier ancient Egyptian languages. Polotsky's theory of the Egyptian verb (a particularly delicate argument, since Egyptians distinguished their different verb forms mainly by the vocalizations, and vowels were not written) had so much success that it has been called the Standard Theory.

In Berlin, Polotsky had been a student of the famous egyptologist Kurt Heinrich Sethe; in Jerusalem, one of his students was Miriam Lichtheim, known for her extensive translations of ancient Egyptian texts.

Awards 
 In 1962, Polotsky received the Rothschild Prize
 In 1966, he was awarded the Israel Prize in the humanities.
 In 1982, he received the Harvey Prize.

Publications 
 (with: Carl Schmidt) Ein Mani-Fund in Ägypten, Original-Schriften des Mani und seiner Schüler. Berlin: Akademie der Wissenschaften 1933.
 "Manichäische Studien", in: Le Muséon 46, 1933, pp. 247–271.
 (ed.) Manichäische Homilien. Stuttgart: W. Kohlhammer 1934.
 Manichäische Handschriften der Staatlichen Museen Berlin,  W. Kohlhammer Stuttgart: 1935
 "Études de grammaire gouragué", in: Bulletin de la Société de Linguistique de Paris 39, 1938, pp. 137–175
 Études de syntaxe copte, Publications de la Société d'Archéologie Copte. Le Caire, 1944
 "Notes on Gurage grammar", Israel Oriental Society, No. 2, 1951
 "Syntaxe amharique et syntaxe turque", in: Atti del Convegno Internazionale di Studi Etiopici, Roma (Acc. Naz. dei Lincei) 1960:, pp. 117–121
 "Studies in Modern Syriac", in Journal of Semitic Studies 6, 1961, pp. 1–32
 "Aramaic, Syriac, and Ge'ez", in: Journal of Semitic Studies 9, 1964, pp. 1–10
 "Egyptian Tenses", The Israel Academy of Sciences and Humanities, Vol. II, No. 5. 1965
 E.Y. Kutscher (ed.), Collected Papers by H.J. Polotsky Magnes Press, Jerusalem 1971
 "Les transpositions du verbe en égyptien classique", in Israel Oriental Studies 6, 1976, pp. 1–50
 "A Point of Arabic Syntax: The Indirect Attribute", in Israel Oriental Studies 8, 1978, pp. 159–174.
 "Verbs with two Objects in Modern Syriac (Urmi)", in Israel Oriental Studies 9, 1979, pp. 204–227.
 Grundlagen des koptischen Satzbaus, Scholars Press, Decatur, Ga., 1987, 
 "Incorporation in Modern Syriac", in G. Goldenberg & Sh. Raz (eds.), Semitic and Cushitic studies. Harrassowitz  Wiesbaden 1994, pp. 90–102.
 "Notes on Neo-Syriac Grammar", in Israel Oriental Studies 16, 1996, pp. 11–48.

See also 
 List of Israel Prize recipients
 Publications access, Hans Jacob Polotsky Hebrew University page

References

Further reading
 Erdal, M. (1994). "Hans Jakob Polotsky (1905-1991) : an appreciation", in: Mediterranean language review, 8, pp. 1–9. 
 Hopkins, S. (1992/3). "H.J. Polotsky 1905-1991", in: Rassegna di Studi Etiopici, 34, pp. 115–125. 
 Osing, J. (1993). "Hans Jakob Polotsky: 13. September 1905 - 10. August 1991", in: Zeitschrift für ägyptische Sprache und Altertumskunde 120/1, pp. iii-v.
 Shisha-Halevy, Ariel (1992). "In memoriam Hans Jakob Polotsky (1905-1991)", in: Orientalia (nova series) 61, pp. 208–213.
 Shisha-Halevy, Ariel (2006). "H. J. Polotsky Structuralist", in: After Polotsky: Proceedings of the Colloquium, Bad Honnef, September 2005 (Lingua Aegyptia 14), pp. 1–8.
 Shisha-Halevy, Ariel & Goldenberg, Gideon (2007). "H. J. Polotsky", in: Lexicon Grammaticorum, 2nd ed., (ed. H. Stammerjohann).
 Shivtiel, A. (1994). "Polotsky Hans (Hayyim) Jacob (1905-91)", in: The encyclopedia of language and linguistics. Oxford: Pergamon, vol. 6, pp. 3226–3227
 Ullendorff, Edward (ed.; 1992). H.J. Polotsky (1905-1991): Ausgewählte Briefe (Äthiopistische Forschungen, Band 34). Stuttgart: Franz Steiner Verlag. 
 Ullendorff, Edward (1994). "H.J. Polotsky (1905-1991): Linguistic Genius", in: Journal of the Royal Asiatic Society, Series 3, 4, 1, pp. 3–13. [=E. Ullendorff, From Emperor Haile Selassie to H.J. Polotsky. Harrassowitz: Wiesbaden 1995, pp. 165–175]

Linguists from Israel
Linguists from Switzerland
Israeli Egyptologists
Coptologists
20th-century linguists
Semiticists
Syntacticians
Members of the Israel Academy of Sciences and Humanities
Israel Prize in humanities recipients
Academic staff of the Hebrew University of Jerusalem
Humboldt University of Berlin alumni
University of Göttingen alumni
Swiss Jews
Swiss people of Russian-Jewish descent
Swiss emigrants to Israel
People from Zürich
1905 births
1991 deaths
Swiss expatriates in Germany
Corresponding Fellows of the British Academy